Emmanuel Church in Grant Road, Mumbai, India is affiliated to the Church of North India and was built in 1869. The building, constructed in Gothic Revival style, is a Grade II heritage structure and was made using Porbandar stone. It was the first church with an Indian congregation to follow the British Church Mission Society (CMS), and though it now falls under the Church of North India, the parishioners still maintain Anglican practices. It was established by Revd. T. K. Weatherhead of the CMS.

References

External links
Bombay Diocesan Trust - Emmanuel Church, Mumbai

Churches in Mumbai
Church of North India church buildings
1869 establishments in India
Religious buildings and structures completed in 1869
Gothic Revival church buildings in India